Mariquina may refer to:
 Félix Berenguer de Marquina, a Spanish naval officer and government official after whom the City of Marikina is named.
 Mariquina, Chile, a commune in Chile
 Marikina, formerly Mariquina, a city in the Philippines
 Mariquina (film), a 2014 Philippine independent film directed by Milo Sogueco, set in the City of Marikina in the Philippines